The Monroe County School District is a public school district based in Monroe County, Mississippi (USA).

The district serves the communities of Smithville, Hatley, Gattman, Hamilton, and New Hamilton as well as a small portion of Amory.

Schools

Home Campus sites
Hamilton School (Grades K-12)
Hatley School (Grades K-12)
Smithville School (Grades K-12)

Off Campus sites
Monroe County Advanced Learning Center (Grades 10-12)
Monroe County Vocational and Technical Center (Grades 10-12)

Demographics

2006-07 school year
There were a total of 2,378 students enrolled in the Monroe County School District during the 2006–2007 school year. The gender makeup of the district was 49% female and 51% male. The racial makeup of the district was 9.67% African American, 89.53% White, 0.63% Hispanic, and 0.17% Asian. 37.7% of the district's students were eligible to receive free lunch.

Previous school years

Accountability statistics

See also
List of school districts in Mississippi

References

External links
 

Education in Monroe County, Mississippi
School districts in Mississippi